Super Refraction is the second full-length album by former Boston, Massachusetts band Mistle Thrush. It was released in 1997 by Egg Records (catalog #7001).

Track listing
All songs written by Mistle Thrush
"Stupid Song" – 3:12
"Moth-Like" – 4:00
"It's All Like Today" – 5:00
"Yellow Day" – 4:25
"51 Pegasi: Rocketship V.2" – 2:39
"Do You Know This Bird?" – 3:06
"All Mirror Thing" – 3:39
"Train Song" – 4:53
"Escapades in Glass" – 4:23
"Sha Sha" – 5:55
"Making Salt With Sunshine" – 2:22
note: at the end of "Making Salt With Sunshine", there's 1:30 of silence followed by a 22:32 sound collage pieced together from samples of the singer's vocals, crafted by producer Kurt Ralske.

Personnel

The band
Todd Demma — Drums, percussion
Valerie Forgione — Vocals, analog keyboards, Theremin, acoustic guitar
Matthew Kattman — Electric and acoustic guitar, back-up vocals ("Moth Like")
Ruben Layman — Bass guitar, back-up vocals ("Moth Like")
Scott Patalano — Electric guitar, vocals ("All Mirror Thing")

Production
Kurt Ralske — Producer, engineer, mixing
Mistle Thrush — Producer
Vaughan Merrick — Engineer, mixing
Chris Athens — Mastering

Additional credits
Recorded at Zabriskie Point, New York City
Mastered at Sony Music Studios, New York City
Valerie Forgione — Artwork, design
"Special thanks to Kurt for the secret track. Ssshhh…"
C. Richard Kattman — Photography
Matthew Kattman — Layout and design ("With a little help from Valerie")

Sources
CD liner notes

1997 albums
Mistle Thrush (band) albums